Loudi is a town of Luancheng District of Shijiazhuang in southwestern Hebei province, China, located in the southern suburbs of Shijiazhuang about  northwest of the Luancheng District seat. , it has 16 villages under its administration.

See also
List of township-level divisions of Hebei

References

Township-level divisions of Hebei